Maydaq is the name of a wadi and also a settlement in Fujairah, United Arab Emirates (UAE), traditionally associated with the Sharqiyin tribe. Wadi Maydaq is a popular venue for hiking and offroading.

References 

Populated places in the Emirate of Fujairah
Villages in the United Arab Emirates